Albaredo per San Marco (Lombard: Albarii) is a comune (municipality) in the Province of Sondrio in the Italian region Lombardy, located about  northeast of Milan and about  southwest of Sondrio.

Albaredo is crossed by the road of San Marco Pass.
Albaredo per San Marco borders the following municipalities: Averara, Bema, Mezzoldo, Morbegno, Talamona, Tartano.

References

Cities and towns in Lombardy
Articles which contain graphical timelines